April Fool's Day is a 1986 American black comedy mystery slasher film directed by Fred Walton, produced by Frank Mancuso Jr., and starring Thomas F. Wilson, Deborah Foreman, Griffin O'Neal, Amy Steel, Ken Olandt, Deborah Goodrich, and Leah Pinsent. The plot follows a group of college students vacationing during April Fool's Day weekend on an island estate, which is infiltrated by an unknown assailant.

Filmed in British Columbia in 1985, April Fool's Day was released in late March 1986 through Paramount Pictures in conjunction with the April 1 holiday. It received varied responses from film critics, with some commending it for its non-gratuitous violence and plot twists, while others lambasted it for its surprise ending.

A remake of the film was released direct-to-video in 2008.

Plot
On the weekend leading up to April Fools' Day, a group of college friends, consisting of Harvey, Nikki, Rob, Skip, Nan, Chaz, Kit, and Arch, gather to celebrate spring break by spending the weekend at the island mansion of Skip's cousin, Vassar student Muffy St. John. As Muffy prepares details around the house, she finds an old jack-in-the-box and recalls receiving the toy at a childhood birthday party. Her friends, meanwhile, joke around on the pier while awaiting the ferry. En route to the island, as their antics become more boisterous, local deckhand Buck is seriously injured in a gruesome accident.

Once on the island, it turns out that Muffy has set up a variety of pranks throughout the mansion, ranging from simple gags such as a whoopee cushion and dribble glasses and exploding cigars to more complex and disturbing pranks, such as an audiotape of a baby crying in someone's room and heroin paraphernalia in a guest's wardrobe. In spite of this, the group tries to relax, until Skip goes missing, and Kit catches a glimpse of what looks like his dead body. Soon, Arch and Nan also go missing. During a search for the pair, Nikki falls into the island's well, where she finds the severed heads of Skip and Arch, along with the dead body of Nan. The remaining group members then discover that the phone lines are dead and there is no way to get off the island until Monday.

One after another, members of the group either vanish or get killed before their bodies are found. After putting some clues together, Kit and Rob realize that everyone's earlier assumption is wrong. It also turns out that Muffy has a violently insane twin sister named Buffy, who has escaped. In fact, the "Muffy" they have been around since the first night was Buffy, pretending to be Muffy. They discover Muffy's severed head in the basement.

Buffy chases them with a curved butcher's knife, and the couple gets separated. Kit flees from Buffy by escaping into the living room where she finds everyone else there, alive and calmly waiting for her. It was all a joke, or more accurately, a dress rehearsal. Muffy reveals that she hopes to turn the mansion into a resort offering a weekend of staged horror. She even had a friend who does special effects and make-up in Hollywood help. Each "victim" agreed to take part as things were explained to them. Everyone has a huge laugh and they break out many bottles of champagne.

Later that night, a half-drunk Muffy goes to her room and finds a wrapped present on her bed. She unwraps it, and the present is a non-descript jack-in-the-box. Savoring the surprise, she turns the handle slowly and when "Jack" finally pops out, Nan, who knew Muffy from acting class, emerges from behind her and slits her throat with a razor. Muffy screams, but then realizes she is not really bleeding and that Nan used a trick razor and stage blood.

Laying on its side, the jack-in-the-box winks.

Cast

Production

Casting
Amy Steel was cast in the role of Kit at the suggestion of producer Frank Mancuso Jr., after Steel had appeared in Mancuso's Friday the 13th Part 2 (1981). In the role of Muffy St. John, the young college coed who holds the gathering at her familial mansion, Deborah Foreman (who had recently starred opposite Nicolas Cage in Valley Girl), auditioned for the role. Walton recalled that he cast Foreman after she "blew them away" during her audition.

Filming
After considering shooting the film at Martha's Vineyard, Massachusetts and Seattle, Washington, producer Frank Mancuso Jr. chose to shoot the film on Vancouver Island in Victoria, British Columbia. Filming took place over a period of six weeks at two private properties in Victoria. Walton reflect that the cast was made up of a "young, very talented group of kids that were having a lot of fun".

Post-production
An additional final sequence the film present in Walton's original cut had the group leaving the island, and Skip enacting an actual murder of Muffy, wanting to take their familial inheritance for himself. Paramount executives disliked this dark turn, and mandated that this final sequence be excised so that the film could end on a high note, with the characters celebrating after the revelation of Muffy's elaborate prank.

Release

Box office
April Fool's Day was theatrically released in the United States on 1,202 screens and earned $3.4 million during its opening weekend, eventually grossing $13 million domestically. Though a commercial success, director Walton reflected: "The tragedy, I think, or the great disappointment was that Paramount didn't know how to release it other than as a typical slasher picture. So most audiences came in expecting to see something that they weren't going to see".

Critical response 
Paul Attanasio of The Washington Post wrote: "The suspense sequences are stylishly managed, and Walton has attractively cast the movie with a number of natural, if unexciting, actors. There is a suburban princess and a jock and a Junior Achievement type and so forth, none of which qualifies Bach for screenwriter of the year, but it's remarkable how effective even these elementary efforts at characterization are in the context of the film". Reviewing the film in The New York Times, Vincent Canby criticised the film's dialogue, its plot, where "nothing in the film is quite what it seems to be, not always intentionally" and the characters, for being "as interchangeable as the actors who play them".   
Writing for The Baltimore Sun, Lou Cedrone addressed the film's muted violence as a response to public criticism of the overt violence in Paramount's Friday the 13th films, and noted that, despite its marketing, he did not view it as a slasher film. The Dayton Journal Heralds Terry Lawson gave the film a three out of four-star rating, praising it as a "well-made and well-acted little enterprise [that] holds a surprise or two". Jeff Rietveld of the Santa Clarita Signal praised the film as "a slasher film for people who don't like slasher films", also commending the acting and direction.

Jay Maeder of the New York Daily News gave the film a scathing review, awarding it zero stars and spoiling the film's surprise ending, writing that it "is so offensively witless that we take a real pleasure in giving it away". Joe Baltake of the Escondido Times-Advocate panned the film based on its sexual content, comparing it to the Friday the 13th series, adding that "none of the mayhem keeps its characters from putting the make on one another or even stopping to have sex. Some of the screams in the night here could imply either brutality or sexuality. April Fool's Day is a film that confuses the two".

AllMovie noted that the film "has more rollercoaster thrills than most slasher flicks with five times the gore", writing: "Amid the glut of gory horror films that clogged the cable schedules and cineplexes in the wake of Halloween and Friday the 13th, April Fool's Day stands out as a fairly restrained exercise in the '80s teen slasher genre". Steve Barton of Dread Central wrote in 2008 that he considers the film "a modern horror classic".

On the review aggregator website Rotten Tomatoes, April Fool's Day holds a 55% approval rating based on 22 critic reviews, with an average rating of 5.4/10.

Because of their similarity, the film is often compared to Agatha Christie's 1939 novel, And Then There Were None.

Home media 
For its home video premiere in the 1980s, it was released to both videocassette and LaserDisc. It has since been released to DVD on four occasions. The first edition was made available on September 3, 2002 through Paramount Home Entertainment. It was then included as one of the films on a triple-feature disc that also included Tales from the Darkside: The Movie and Stephen King's Graveyard Shift in August 2007. Eight months later, in March 2008, it was offered as a double feature with My Bloody Valentine (1981), and again as a standalone release in 2013.

Scream Factory released the film for the first time on Blu-ray in a collector's edition; the Blu-ray was released on March 24, 2020.

Soundtrack 
A soundtrack for the film was released in 1986 on vinyl only. The soundtrack consists of 19 cues and runs approximately 30:27. In 2015, as part of Varèse Sarabande's LP to CD subscription series, the vinyl album was released on cd for the first time in a replica vinyl cardboard slip.

Track listing
 "Intro"
 "Main Title"
 "Choke a Dagger"
 "Pier Pressure"
 "All's Well That Ends"
 "Snakes Alive"
 "Stab in the Dark"
 "Hanging Around"
 "The House"
 "Trick or Threat"
 "Nan in Danger"
 "Nightwatch"
 "Sitting Duck"
 "Night"
 "Getting the Point"
 "Little Miss Muffy"
 "Muffy Attack"
 "First Victim"
 "Hack-in-the-Box"

Related works 
A novelization of the film by Jeff Rovin was published in 1986 by Pocket Books alongside its theatrical release. This novelization features an alternate ending in which Skip sneaks back onto the island after everyone has left to kill Muffy for his share of the family money, though he fails and winds up dead himself. This ending has never been released, but stills of it have surfaced. A revised draft of the script included another version of the above-mentioned ending in which Skip sneaks back onto the island to kill Muffy. He springs out of a closet and cuts her throat. At first panics then realizes it's all a joke when she sees her friends standing around. The script then states that Skip stays on the island to help Muffy with the bed and breakfast.

A straight-to-DVD remake was released in March 2008. Though it retains the original concept, the story and characters are radically altered in an effort to make it more contemporary.

References

Sources

External links 

 
 

1986 independent films
1980s mystery films
1980s slasher films
1980s teen horror films
1986 films
1986 horror films
American independent films
American mystery films
American slasher films
American teen horror films
American mystery horror films
Films about pranks
Films directed by Fred Walton (director)
Films scored by Charles Bernstein
Films set in country houses
Films set on islands
Films shot in British Columbia
Holiday horror films
Paramount Pictures films
1980s English-language films
1980s American films